Rixford is an unincorporated community in McKean County, Pennsylvania, United States. Rixford has a post office with ZIP code 16745.

References

Unincorporated communities in McKean County, Pennsylvania
Unincorporated communities in Pennsylvania